A fatal accident inquiry is a Scottish judicial process which investigates and determines the circumstances of some deaths occurring in Scotland. Until 2009, they did not apply to any deaths occurring in other jurisdictions, when the Coroners and Justice Act 2009 extended the Fatal Accidents and Sudden Deaths Inquiry (Scotland) Act 1976 to service personnel at the discretion of the Chief Coroner or the Secretary of State. The equivalent process in England and Wales is an inquest. A major review of the fatal accident inquiries was undertaken by Lord Cullen of Whitekirk, at the request of the Scottish Government, which resulted in the passing of the Inquiries into Fatal Accidents and Sudden Deaths etc. (Scotland) Act 2016.

History
Fatal accident inquiries were introduced into Scots Law by the Fatal Accidents Inquiry (Scotland) Act 1895, before which time the circumstances of a death which required examination were determined by a procurator fiscal. Since then, the procurator fiscal now deals with the investigation and initiation of such inquiries. The applicable legislation is the Fatal Accidents and Sudden Deaths Inquiry (Scotland) Act 1976 and Inquiries into Fatal Accidents and Sudden Deaths etc. (Scotland) Act 2016, and the law provides for inquiries to be held on a mandatory basis for some deaths and on a discretionary basis for others.

Previously, a fatal accident inquiry only dealt with deaths that occurred in Scotland, whereas in England and Wales a Coroner will deal with the investigation of a death where the body lies within their district irrespective of where the death actually occurred. This led to some distress being caused to the families of service personnel who had been killed abroad but whose bodies have been returned through or to England at the insistence of the Ministry of Defence and in consequence their funerals have been delayed.

The inquiries process was reviewed by Lord Cullen of Whitekirk for the Scottish Government in 2008, following which the Scottish Government consulted on proposals in 2014. The Inquiries into Fatal Accidents and Sudden Deaths etc. (Scotland) Act 2016 was passed by the Scottish Parliament on 10 December 2015, and replaced the 1976 act when it came into force in June 2017.

Process

Death certificates
A person cannot be buried or cremated in Scotland unless a medical practitioner has issued a death certificate (and the associated certificate of registration of death, known as a form 14, has been issued), and doctors are mandated to report certain sudden, suspicious, accidental, or unexplained deaths to the procurator fiscal, and the report will be received by the Scottish Fatalities Investigation Unit, part of the Crown Office and Procurator Fiscal Service. The procurator fiscal can require a Police investigation, and where mandated by statute, or otherwise at their discretion, the procurator fiscal can hold a fatal accident inquiry.

Criminal acts
Where the death appears to be due to a criminal act, the procurator fiscal will initiate investigations by the police, or other appropriate public authorities, to enable the identification of suspects and associated evidence to enable them to prosecute the case in the Sheriff Court, or for an Advocate Depute to prosecute in the High Court of Justiciary.

Mandatory inquiries
A fatal accident inquiry is mandated by the 2016 Act if the death occurred while the deceased was in lawful custody or whilst they were at work. Other inquiries may be held where the procurator fiscal decides it is "expedient in the public interest". The Lord Advocate has the discretion not to hold an inquiry (including a mandatory inquiry) where the circumstances of the death have been adequately established in criminal proceedings.

Territorial jurisdiction
A fatal accident inquiry will take place before a Sheriff (judge) in a Sheriff court; there is no jury. Proceedings are inquisitorial, as opposed to adversarial. Evidence is presented by the procurator fiscal in the public interest, and other parties may be represented. Parties can choose representation by Advocate (counsel) or solicitor, or may appear in person.

A fatal accident inquiry does not need to take place in the sheriffdom where the death occurred, and will take place in whichever sheriffdom the Lord Advocate determines. Although the Lord Advocate must consult the Scottish Courts and Tribunals Service before making a determination. A sheriff may make an order to transfer the inquiry subject to another sherrifdom, subject the approval of the relevant sheriffs principal.

Determinations
Section 6 of the 1976 Act the Sheriff is required to produce a determination. In drafting a determination the Sheriff is required to consider five distinct areas:
Time and place of the death
The cause of death
Any precautions which may have avoided the death
Any defects in the system of working which may have avoided the death
Any other relevant considerations.

The 2016 Act introduces several changes to the previous system governed by the 1976 Act, including:
 Mandatory inquiries for deaths in lawful custody are extended to the deaths of children in secure accommodation
 Discretionary inquiries can held at the direction of the Lord Advocate for deaths abroad
 If requested, the Lord Advocate must provide a written explanation if they decide not to hold an inquiry
 Inquiries may be reopened, or a fresh inquiry held, where there is new evidence

Events subject to a fatal accident inquiry
Examples include:
 The Quintinshill rail disaster in 1915
 The 1971 Ibrox disaster
 The Waage Drill II diving accident (1975)
 The Venture One diving accident (1977)
 The Star Canopus diving accident (1978)
 The Wildrake diving accident (1979)
 Pan Am Flight 103, Lockerbie (1988)
 1994 Scotland RAF Chinook crash, Mull of Kintyre
 The helicopter crash that killed Colin McRae in 2007
 2014 Glasgow bin lorry crash

See also
 Courts of Scotland
 Crown Office
 Lord Advocate
 Inquests in England and Wales

References

External links
 Our role in investigating deaths on the Procurator Fiscal Service website

 
1895 establishments in Scotland
1895 in British law